Tarapu (Aymara for clusia pachamamae used in religious ceremonies (incense), hispanicized spelling Tarapo) is a mountain in the Andes of Peru which reaches an altitude of approximately . It is located in the Lima Region, Canta Province, Canta District, and in the Huarochirí Province, Laraos District. Tarapu lies southwest of a lake named Qiwllaqucha (Quechua for "gull lake").

References

Mountains of Peru
Mountains of Lima Region